Possession is a play by Lyle Kessler. It was directed by James Hammerstein at the Ensemble Studio Theatre, New York City, on March 25, 1976 . 

It was included in The Best Plays of 1975-1976 by Otis Guernsey

Plays by Lyle Kessler
1976 plays